Bhera  is a city and tehsil of Sargodha District, Punjab province of Pakistan. The city is known for wood-carved items, textiles (such as quilts and khussas), and certain desserts (such as pheonian and pateesa).

The city is made up of the Old Town and the surrounding newer development. The Old Town is surrounded by tall walls with eight gates, and is divided up into mohallas, or neighborhoods; historically, different castes lived in different mohallas.

The novel Mayyadas Ki Mari (Mayyadas's Castle), written by Indian playwright Bhisham Singh Sahni, takes place in Bhera.

History
According to Ancient Geography of India by Alexander Cunningham, Bhera was once known as Jobnathnagar.

The Imperial Gazetteer of India records the history of Bhera:

In the recent past centuries, Bhera was an important trading outpost on the road to Kabul, and boasted of a taksal (mint) during the rule of Ranjit Singh.  The city was known for its knife and cutlery craftsmen, who made fighting daggers (Pesh-kabz) as well as hunting knives and table cutlery, often fitted with handles of serpentine (false jade) or horn. Sir Robert Baden-Powell described the process by which craftsmen manufactured gem-quality serpentine aka false jade from ores obtained from Afghanistan: "The sang-i-yesham (ore) is cut by means of an iron saw, and water mixed with red sand and pounded (with) kurand (corundum). It is polished by application to the san (polishing wheel), wetted with water only, then by being kept wet with water, and rubbed with a piece of wati (smooth pottery fragment), and lastly by rubbing very finely pounded burnt sang-i-yesham on it.  This last process must be done very thoroughly."

Attacks on Bhera through history
Bhera has also been attacked by a series of invaders, including:
 Alexander the Great
 Mahmud of Ghazni sacked the city in 1004 CE
 Genghis Khan
 Babar held it for ransom in 1519
 Mirza Muhammad Hakim sacked the city in 1566 C.E.
 Ahmad Shah Durrani attacked in 1757

Bhera in Ferishta's Chronicle
Farishta records
that after attacking Ajoodhun, now Pakpattan:

Notable people 
 Muhammad Karam Shah al-Azhari, ex-Justice Supreme Court of Pakistan; Islamic scholar
 Amarnath Vidyalankar, renowned Indian politician and social worker
 Balraj Sahni, Bollywood actor and writer
 Birbal Sahni, renowned paleobotanist
 Shanti Swaroop Bhatnagar, eminent scientist
 Ehsan-ul-Haq Piracha, Finance Minister of Pakistan, 1988–1990
 J.C. Anand, film producer and distributor, founded Eveready Pictures
 Hakeem Noor-ud-Din, first caliph of Ahmadiyya; renowned physician; scholar of Arabic and Hebrew
 Maulvi Sher Ali, Ahmadi missionary, known for his English translations of the Quran
 Bashir A. Tahir, Sitara-e-Imtiaz
 Neelo, Pakistani film actress
 Sikandar Sultan Raja, Current Chief Election Comissoner of Pakistan
 Dr. M. Khalid Bakhsh, Advisor, Royal Private Affairs KSA
 Sheikh Inam ul Haq Piracha, Ex District Governor (Nazim) and MNA National Assembly of Pakistan

Education
There are following notable educational institutes in Bhera.

Alkaram International University Bhera Bhera City
The Reader Group of Collages, bhera Campus
Govt. High School Bhera , since 1885
Ripha Internation Collage and University, Ali Pur Syedan Bhera
Hafsa National School System Bhera, Motorway link road Bhera
The superior Collage,Bhera Campus
Punjab Collage, Bhera Campus
Iqbal Public School Bhera, Bhalwal road
The Educators School  .Phularwan road Bhera
Welfare Girls Collage, Ali Pur Syedan Bhera
Ghosia Girls Collage Bhera, Bhera City
Govt. Degree Collage For Boys Bhera
Govt. Degree Collage For Girls Bhera
Govt. Islamia High School  , Bhera
Govt. AI Model High School Bhera, Bhera City
 
Design Computer Institute Bhera, Near ZTBL Bhalwal Road Bhera City

Historical places in the vicinity
 Tilla Jogian
 Salt Range
Medhara

References

External links
 Bhera – The Town that Time forgot Part 1

Populated places in Sargodha District
Sargodha District
Tehsils of Punjab, Pakistan